The following are the national records in track cycling in Azerbaijan maintained by the Azerbaijan Cycling Federation (AzViF).

Men

Women

References

External links
 AzViF official website

Azerbaijan
Records
Track cycling
track cycling